Dr. Hugh E. Scully is a Canadian surgeon who is involved with motorsport medical care. He was inducted into the Canadian Motorsport Hall of Fame in 1991 for his contributions to motorsport worldwide.

Scully earned his medical degree at Queen's University in Kingston, Ontario. He trained in cardiac surgery at  hospitals affiliated with the University of Toronto and Harvard University.

Scully founded the Ontario Race Physicians and the Professional Association of Internes and Residents of Ontario, performed surgery at Toronto General Hospital, and was professor of surgery at the University of Toronto. Scully served as a president of the Ontario Medical Association,  the Canadian Medical Association and the International Council of Motorsport Sciences.

References

Canadian motorsport people
Harvard Medical School alumni
Canadian surgeons
Living people
Canadian sports physicians
Year of birth missing (living people)